Saint-Martin was a railway station on the Saint-Jérôme line at 800, boul. Saint-Martin Ouest (corner of boulevard Industriel) in  Laval, Quebec, Canada. The station was one of the original four stations of the temporary Blainville line opened in 1997 to serve commuters during the construction on the Marius Dufresne Bridge. The station was located at Boulevard Saint Martin. This station had 190 parking spaces.

History 
Saint-Martin Junction, a former Canadian Pacific Railway station, was located further north at the point where the CP lines, now QGR lines, to Ottawa and Quebec City separated. This station was used by Via Rail until January 1990.

References

Former Exo commuter rail stations
Railway stations in Canada opened in 1997
Railway stations closed in 2007
1997 establishments in Quebec
2007 disestablishments in Quebec
Disused railway stations in Canada
Railway stations in Laval, Quebec